Route 340 also called Clarkson Road or Olive Boulevard is a highway in the St. Louis metropolitan area. Its western terminus is Route 100 (Manchester Road) in Ellisville, and its eastern terminus is at an intersection with Ferguson Avenue and Olive Boulevard in University City. The stretch of Route 340 between Manchester Road and the Interstate 64 / U.S. 40 / U.S. 61 interchange is known locally as Clarkson Road. The remainder of Route 340 between this intersection and its eastern terminus is variously known as Olive Boulevard (which does not connect with Olive Street in the city of St. Louis. Route 340 ends at Ferguson Avenue in University City, but Olive Boulevard continues to Skinker Boulevard on the St. Louis city line.

Route description

Mass transit
MetroBus Route 91 (Olive) travels the entirety of the Olive Street Road and Olive Boulevard part of Route 340 from Chesterfield Mall to the Delmar Loop. Part of MetroBus Route 58X (Twin Oaks Express) travels along the entirety of Clarkson Road.

Major intersections

References

340
Transportation in St. Louis County, Missouri